Saints Cosmas and Damian church orthodox parish church (PCU) in Shmankivtsi of the Zavodske settlement hromada of the Chortkiv Raion of the Ternopil Oblast.

History 
In 1885, a new stone Greek Catholic church was built and consecrated on the site of a wooden church, by the parishioners of the villages of Shmankivtsi and Shmankivchyky. Architect - Joseph Stets.

In 1869 the parishioners of the village and Mykola Karpinsky (founder) built the chapel of St. Nicholas, which was first renewed in 1926. In Soviet times, the figure of St. Nicholas was moved to the churchyard. In 1989, the chapel was restored.

In May–September 1939, through the efforts of Fr. Porphyry Gordievsky painted in memory of the 950th anniversary of the baptism of Rus'-Ukraine (artist M. Chuiko).

In 1959, on the occasion of the 25th anniversary of his priesthood, the church was reconstructed with the donations of parishioners and the efforts of Pastor Mykola Stetsyk (artists Marko Nikolyshyn, Zinoviy Timoshik, plasterer Ivan Babiy).

In 2020, a cross was found in the bell tower building, which once served as a wooden temple.

There is a fraternity, a sisterhood, a church committee and a church choir.

Near the church grows a botanical natural monument of local significance "Oak Shashkevych".

Abbots 
 at. Gavriil Romanovich (1732—1733)
 at. Semyon Studinsky (1831)
 at. Yuri Syroydkovsky (1831-1838)
 at. Mikhail Grabovich (1838—1867)
 at. Nicholas Charnetsky (1867—1882)
 at. Ivan Mohylnytsky (1882-1883)
 at. Ivan Gordievsky (1883-1909)
 at. Porphyry Gordievsky (1909-1938)
 at. Vladimir Haruk (1937-1938)
 at. Osip Dribniuk (1938-1945)
 at. Mykola Stetsyk (1945—1980)
 at. Ivan Hnidec (1980-2001)
 at. Volodymyr Lyzhechko of February 13, 2001.

See also 
 Saints Cosmas and Damian church, Shmankivtsi (Greek Catholic)

References

Sources 
 с. Шманьківці. Храм св. вмч. і безсрр Косми і Даміана // Храми Української Православної Церкви Київського патріархату. Тернопільщина / Автор концепції Куневич Б.; головний редактор Буяк Я.; фото: Снітовський О., Крочак І., Кислинський Е., Бурдяк В. — Тернопіль : ТОВ «Новий колір», 2012. — С. 383. : іл. — ISBN 978-966-2061-24-6.
 Smankivci // Історичний шематизм Львівської архієпархії (1832—1944) : у 2 т. / Дмитро Блажейовський. — Київ : КМ Академія, 2004. — Т. 1 : Адміністрація і парохії. — С. 744–745. — ISBN 966-518-225-0.
 Smankivci // Блажейовський Д. Історичний шематизм Станиславівської єпархії від її заснування до початку Другої світової війни (1885—1938). — Записки ЧСВВ, Секція I. — Т. 51. — Львів : Місіонер, 2002. — С. 212. — ISBN 966-658-228-4.

Shmankivtsi